John Buttigieg (born 9 January 1977) is an Australian former professional rugby league footballer who played in the 1990s and 2000s. A Queensland State of Origin representative , he spent his entire club career with the North Queensland Cowboys.

Background
Born in Townsville, Queensland, Buttigieg is of Indigenous Australian and Maltese descent. He played his junior rugby league for Souths Townsville and attended Pimlico State High School before being signed by the North Queensland Cowboys.

Playing career
In 1994, Buttigieg represented the Queensland under-17 team, starting at prop in a loss to New South Wales. In 1995, he was a member of the Cowboys' youth development squad.

He played nine games during his rookie season. In 1999, after just 13 games the previous two seasons, Buttigieg became a regular in the Cowboys starting side, playing 17 games and winning the club's Players' Player award. In Round 6 of the 1999 season, he knocked out Penrith Panthers prop Craig Greenhill at Dairy Farmers Stadium during an off the ball incident. In October 1999, he represented the Arthur Beetson-coached Aborigines side, who defeated Papua New Guinea in a two-game series.

In 2001, Buttigieg made his State of Origin debut for Queensland, scoring a try in a 34–16 win over New South Wales at Lang Park. He missed Game II due to injury, but was recalled for the Game III decider, in which Queensland won the series.

In 2002, Buttiegied played 16 games for the Cowboys and again represented Queensland, playing in Game I of the series. In Round 13 of the 2003 NRL season, he played his 100th first grade game in a 24–28 loss to Penrith. On 25 August 2003, Buttigieg announced his retirement, due to an ongoing knee injury. Buttigiegs' right knee was operating bone on bone due to lack of cartilage, resulting in swelling.

Achievements and accolades

Individual
North Queensland Cowboys Players' Player: 1999

Statistics

ARL/Super League/NRL

State of Origin

Post-playing career
Following his retirement, Buttigieg moved to Mount Isa, where he coached the Mount Isa Bulls for a year before the club folded.

References

External links

Queensland Representatives at qrl.com.au

1977 births
Living people
Australian people of Maltese descent
Australian rugby league players
Indigenous Australian rugby league players
North Queensland Cowboys players
Queensland Rugby League State of Origin players
Rugby league players from Townsville
Rugby league props